The 2012 Africa Cup of Nations, also known as the Orange Africa Cup of Nations for sponsorship reasons, was the 28th edition of the Africa Cup of Nations, the football championship of Africa organized by the Confederation of African Football (CAF).

The competition took place between 21 January and 12 February 2012 and was co-hosted by Equatorial Guinea and Gabon. The bidding process for hosting the tournament ended in September 2006.

The matches were played in four stadiums in four host cities, with the final played at the newly built Stade d'Angondjé in Gabon's largest city, Libreville. Fourteen teams were selected for participation via a continental qualification tournament that began in July 2010.

The 2012 edition of the Africa Cup of Nations took place against the backdrop of political turmoil. Libya and Tunisia qualified for the tournament, even as the Arab Spring brought upheaval and regime change to both nations. Traditional African footballing nations such as reigning champions Egypt (also affected by political events), as well as Cameroon, Algeria, Nigeria and South Africa had failed to qualify. Players from third-placed Mali had pleaded for the insurgency in the north of their country to end.

In the first round of the tournament finals, the teams competed in round-robin groups of four teams for points, with the top two teams in each group proceeding. These eight teams advanced to the knockout stage, where three rounds of play decided which teams would participate in the final. Both host nations, Equatorial Guinea and Gabon, were eliminated from the competition at the quarter final stage.

In the final, unfancied Zambia defeated third-time finalists Ivory Coast after a dramatic penalty shootout, despite the fact that Ivory Coast did not concede a single goal during the entire tournament, giving Zambia their first continental title. Manager Hervé Renard dedicated their win to the members of the national team who died in a plane crash near the final's venue in Libreville in 1993.

Host selection
Bids :
Angola
Gabon / Equatorial Guinea
Libya
Nigeria

Rejected Bids :
Benin / Central African Republic
Botswana
Mozambique
Namibia
Senegal
Zimbabwe

On 4 September 2006, the Confederation of African Football (CAF) approved a compromise between rival countries to host the Africa Cup of Nations after it ruled out Nigeria. CAF agreed to award the next three editions from 2010 to Angola, Equatorial Guinea, Gabon and Libya respectively. They assigned Angola in 2010, Equatorial Guinea and Gabon, which submitted a joint bid in 2012, and Libya for 2014.

This edition was awarded to Gabon and Equatorial Guinea to rotate the hosting of the cup and give hosting chance for first-timer nations.

Two-time former host Nigeria was the reserve host for the 2010, 2012 and 2014 tournaments, in the event that any of the host countries failed to meet the requirements established by CAF, although this ended up being unnecessary

The 2014 tournament was pushed forward to 2013 and subsequently held in odd-numbered years to avoid clashing with the FIFA World Cup.

Qualification

The qualification process involved ten groups of four, one of which was reduced to a group of three after the withdrawal of Mauritania, and one group of five. The top team from each group goes through, as well as the second placed team from the group of five. The two best second place teams also qualify. At the end of the qualification process, fourteen teams would have qualified, as well as the two host nations. The first qualifiers were held on 1 July 2010.

Qualified teams

1 FIFA World Rankings, release of 18 January 2012.

Controversies

Togo
Togo were initially banned from the 2012 and 2013 Africa Cup of Nations tournaments by CAF after they withdrew from the 2010 tournament following an attack on their team bus. Togo appealed to the Court of Arbitration for Sport, with FIFA president Sepp Blatter stepping in to mediate. The ban was subsequently lifted with immediate effect on 14 May 2010, after a meeting of the CAF Executive Committee. Togo were therefore free to play in the 2012 and 2013 qualifiers.

Nigeria
On 30 June 2010, after Nigeria's exit from the 2010 FIFA World Cup, Nigerian President Goodluck Jonathan punished the team for a poor campaign by imposing a two-year ban from international competition. This would have resulted in the Nigerians missing out on both the 2012 qualifying phase and the 2012 African Cup of Nations. However, on 5 July, the Nigerian government dropped the ban after FIFA threatened to impose harsher international sanctions as a result of the government interference. Nigeria competed in qualifying for the 2012 Africa Cup of Nations as scheduled but failed to qualify.

Venues
The opening match, one semi-final and the third place match were held in Equatorial Guinea, while the other semi-final and the final were held in Gabon.

Draw
The draw for the final tournament took place on 29 October 2011 at the Sipopo Conference Palace in Malabo, Equatorial Guinea. The draw ceremony was attended by the two presidents from the host countries, President Ali Bongo of Gabon and President Teodoro Obiang Nguema of Equatorial Guinea. The draw saw the 16 qualified teams being pitted into four groups of four teams each. The two top teams from each group will qualify for the quarter finals with the winners progressing to the semi finals and final eventually.

The two hosts were automatically seeded into pot 1. The other 14 qualified teams were ranked based on their performances during the previous three Africa Cup of Nations tournaments. For each of the last three African Cup of Nations final tournaments, the following system of points is adopted for the qualified countries:

Moreover, a weighted coefficient on points was given to each of the last three editions of the Africa Cup of Nations as follows:
 2010 edition: points to be multiplied by 3
 2008 edition: points to be multiplied by 2
 2006 edition: points to be multiplied by 1

The teams were then divided into four pots based on the ranking. Each group contained one team from each pot.

Match officials
The following referees were chosen for the 2012 Africa Cup of Nations.

Squads

Each team's squad for the tournament consisted of 23 players; only players in these squads were eligible to take part in the tournament. Each participating national association had to submit their squad by 11 January 2012 (midnight CET). Replacement of seriously injured players was permitted until 24 hours before the team in question's first match of the tournament.

Group stage
Groups A and B took place in Equatorial Guinea, while Groups C and D were held in Gabon. Notably, there was not a single goalless draw during the group stage.

Tie-breaking criteria
If two or more teams end the group stage with the same number of points, their ranking is determined by the following criteria:
 points earned in the matches between the teams concerned;
 goal difference in the matches between the teams concerned;
 number of goals scored in the matches between the teams concerned;
 goal difference in all group matches;
 number of goals scored in all group matches;
 fair play points system taking into account the number of yellow and red cards;
 drawing of lots by the organising committee.

All times are West Africa Time (UTC+1).

Group A

Group B

Group C

Group D

Knockout stage

Quarterfinals

Semifinals

Third place match

Final

Awards
 Player of the tournament:  Christopher Katongo
 Top goalscorer of the competition:  Emmanuel Mayuka
 Fair Player of the competition:  Jean-Jacques Gosso 
 Fair Play award:

Team of the tournament

Goalkeeper
  Kennedy Mweene

Defenders
  Jean-Jacques Gosso
  Stophira Sunzu
  John Mensah
  Adama Tamboura

Midfielders
  Emmanuel Mayuka
  Yaya Touré
  Gervinho
  Seydou Keita

Forwards
  Christopher Katongo
  Didier Drogba

Substitutes
  Boubacar Barry
  Rui
  Youssef Msakni
  Manucho
  Éric Mouloungui
  Pierre-Emerick Aubameyang
  Sadio Diallo
  Cheick Diabaté
  Houssine Kharja
  Mudather El Tahir
  Rainford Kalaba
  Kwadwo Asamoah

Scorers
3 goals

  Manucho
  Pierre-Emerick Aubameyang
  Didier Drogba
  Cheick Diabaté
  Houssine Kharja
  Christopher Katongo
  Emmanuel Mayuka

2 goals

  André Ayew
  John Mensah
  Abdoul Camara
  Sadio Diallo
  Ihaab Boussefi
  Ahmed Saad Osman
  Mohamed Ahmed Bashir
  Mudather El Tahir
  Youssef Msakni

1 goal

  Mateus
  Mogakolodi Ngele
  Dipsy Selolwane
  Issiaka Ouédraogo
  Alain Traoré
  Javier Balboa
  Kily
  Randy
  Daniel Cousin
  Bruno Zita Mbanangoyé
  Éric Mouloungui
  Stéphane N'Guéma
  Emmanuel Agyemang-Badu
  Asamoah Gyan
  Mamadou Bah
  Naby Soumah
  Ibrahima Traoré
  Wilfried Bony
  Emmanuel Eboué
  Gervinho
  Salomon Kalou
  Yaya Touré
  Garra Dembélé
  Seydou Keita
  Bakaye Traoré
  Younès Belhanda
  William N'Gounou
  Deme N'Diaye
  Dame N'Doye
  Moussa Sow
  Issam Jemâa
  Saber Khelifa
  Khaled Korbi
  James Chamanga
  Rainford Kalaba
  Stophira Sunzu

Own goal
  Bakary Koné (playing against Ivory Coast)

Team statistics

|-
| colspan=14 | Eliminated in the quarterfinals
|-

|-
| colspan=14 | Eliminated in the group stage
|-

By sub-region

Mascot
The mascot for the 2012 Africa Cup of Nations was unveiled on 16 September 2011 at a ceremony in Libreville, Gabon. The mascot, named Gaguie, is a gorilla sporting the national team colors of Gabon and Equatorial Guinea.

Match ball
The official match ball for the 2012 Africa Cup of Nations, manufactured by Adidas, was the Comoequa. The name was inspired by the Komo River, which runs through the host nations, and the Equator, which runs throughout Africa and unites the host nations.

Marketing

Sponsorship

Notes

References

External links

 Africa Cup of Nations at CAFonline.com

 
Africa Cup of Nations tournaments
International association football competitions hosted by Gabon
International association football competitions hosted by Equatorial Guinea
Nations
Africa Cup of Nations
Africa Cup of Nations
Africa Cup of Nations
Africa Cup of Nations